The 2022–23 season is Al-Hilal's 47th consecutive season in the top flight of Saudi football and 65th year in existence as a football club. The club will participate in the Pro League, the King Cup, the 2022 AFC Champions League, and the Saudi Super Cup.

The season covers the period from 1 July 2022 to 30 June 2023.

Players

Squad information

Out on loan

Transfers and loans

Transfers in

Transfers out

Loans out

Pre-season and friendlies

Competitions

Overview

Goalscorers

Last Updated: 18 March 2023

Assists

Last Updated: 18 March 2023

Clean sheets

Last Updated: 18 March 2023

References

Al Hilal SFC seasons
Hilal